Tropaeas subulata is a species of sea snail, a marine gastropod mollusk in the family Pyramidellidae, the pyrams and their allies.

Description
The whitish, somewhat shining shell is smooth and pellucid. The length of the shell is 9.5 mm. Its apex is mucronate. The whorls of the teleoconch are plano-convex, strongly longitudinally costate, and with punctate interstices. The columella is uniplicate in the middle. The aperture is produced and subchanneled below. The shell is umbilicated.

Distribution
This marine species occurs in the Red Sea, off the Philippines and off Japan.

References

External links
 To World Register of Marine Species

Pyramidellidae
Gastropods described in 1853